Tullahoma is the fourth studio album by American country music singer Dustin Lynch. It was released on January 17, 2020, by Broken Bow Records. The album was produced by Zach Crowell and includes the singles "Good Girl", "Ridin' Roads", and "Momma's House".

Content
Prior to the album's release, Lynch released the singles "Good Girl" and "Ridin' Roads". The latter appeared on an EP of the same name, also including the tracks "Little Town Livin'" and "Red Dirt Blue Eyes", both of which also appear on Tullahoma. Lynch co-produced the album with Zach Crowell. Both are also contributing songwriters to the project, along with Old Dominion lead singer Matthew Ramsey, Brian Kelley of Florida Georgia Line, Rhett Akins, Dallas Davidson, Luke Laird, Dylan Schneider, and busbee. The album name comes from Lynch's hometown of Tullahoma, Tennessee.

Critical reception

AllMusic's Stephen Thomas Erlewine commended Lynch for utilizing the groove he used on Current Mood to make the record a more breezy and personal affair but noted that his "unrepentant cheerfulness" makes it difficult for listeners to tell what he's singing about, concluding that, "Some could call this tonal consistency, but the adherence to the middle of the road makes Tullahoma not much more than finely crafted background music."

Commercial performance
Tullahoma debuted at number four on Billboards Top Country Albums with 16,000 album-equivalent units units, 7,000 of which are in traditional album sales. As of March 2020, it has sold 13,500 copies in the United States, and 221,000 in consumed units.

Track listing

Personnel
Adapted from the Tullahoma media notes.

Vocals
Lauren Alaina – featured vocals (track 3)
Sarah Buxton – background vocals
Ben Caver – background vocals
Zach Crowell – background vocals
Justin Ebach – background vocals
Dustin Lynch – lead vocals
Matt Ramsey – background vocals
Bryan Simpson – background vocals
Russell Terrell – background vocals

Instrumentation
Zach Crowell – bass guitar, electric guitar, keyboards, programming
Justin Ebach – acoustic guitar, programming
David Garcia – keyboards, programming
Josh Jenkins – programming
Luke Laird – acoustic guitar
Michael Lotten – keyboards
Devin Malone – acoustic guitar, electric guitar, mandolin, pedal steel guitar
Josh Matheny – dobro, acoustic guitar
Sol Philcox-Littlefield – acoustic guitar, electric guitar
Joshua Sales – drums
Scotty Sanders – dobro, lap steel guitar, pedal steel guitar
Jimmie Lee Sloas – bass guitar
Aaron Sterling – drums
Ilya Toshinsky – banjo, bouzouki, acoustic guitar
Will Weatherly – acoustic guitar, programming
Derek Wells – electric guitar
Nir Z. – drums

Technical
Zach Crowell – producer, engineer , mixing 
Jim Cooley – engineer , mixing
Josh Ditty – engineer 
Billy Decker – mixing 
Joel McKenney – assistant engineer
Ryan Yount – assistant engineer
Andrew Mendelson – mastering
Scott Johnson – production assistance

Imagery
Connor Dwyer – photography
Daniel Vorlet – photography
Cherie Kilchrist – wardrobe stylist
Sharla Pruitt-Higgins – hair and make-up artist
Brad Hersh – artwork, package design

Charts

Weekly charts

Year-end charts

Singles

Notes

References

2020 albums
Dustin Lynch albums
BBR Music Group albums
Albums produced by Zach Crowell